Jens Christensen may refer to:

 Jens Christensen (bishop) (1899–1966), Danish Lutheran missionary and bishop
 Jens Peter Christensen (born 1956), Danish judge
 Jens Christensen (sailor) (born 1953), Danish sailor
 Jens Christian Christensen (1856–1930), Danish politician
 Harald Christensen (wrestler) (Jens Harald Christensen, 1884–1959), Danish wrestler